The Louisiana Wing of Civil Air Patrol (CAP) is the highest echelon of Civil Air Patrol in the state of Louisiana. Louisiana Wing headquarters are located in Baton Rouge, Louisiana. The Louisiana Wing consists of over 600 cadet and adult members at 18 locations across the state of Louisiana.

Mission
The Louisiana Wing performs the three primary missions of Civil Air Patrol: providing emergency services; providing a cadet program for youth; and offering aerospace education for both CAP members and the general public.

Emergency services
Civil Air Patrol has an emergency services mission, which includes performing search and rescue and disaster relief missions; as well as providing assistance in administering humanitarian aid. The CAP provides Air Force support by conducting light transport, communications support, and low-altitude route surveys; they can also offer support to counter-drug missions.

In 2005, the Louisiana Wing participated in recovery efforts following Hurricane Katrina. At least 94 senior members from the Louisiana Wing volunteered a total of 604 man-days, and five cadets participated for 28 days. Louisiana mission pilots, observers and scanners took part in 433 aerial search and rescue and aerial photography missions, totaling 1,025 hours in the air.

Cadet programs
Civil Air Patrol offers cadet programs for youth aged 12 to 21. Cadets are trained in aerospace education, leadership training, physical fitness and moral leadership.

The Louisiana Wing runs an encampment in the summer.

Aerospace education
Civil Air Patrol offers aerospace education for cadet and senior Civil Air Patrol members, and the general public; this includes offering training to the members of the CAP, and teaching students through workshops taught at schools and public aviation events.

Organization

Legal protection
Members of Civil Air Patrol who are employed within the borders of Louisiana are entitled to a leave of absence from their place of employment, up to fifteen days per calendar year, to take part in Civil Air Patrol missions or training, without loss of pay, time, annual leave, or efficiency rating.

See also
Louisiana Air National Guard
Louisiana Army National Guard
Louisiana State Guard
United States Coast Guard Auxiliary

References

External links
Louisiana Wing Civil Air Patrol official website

Wings of the Civil Air Patrol
Education in Louisiana
Military in Louisiana
Articles containing video clips